Kise Apna Kahein is an Indian television series that aired on Sahara Manoranjan. The series premiered on 26 May 2003 and is produced by Saira Banu and Dilip Kumar's production house Sharp Focus Productions.

Plot
The story revolves around the life of a wealthy and beautiful girl Noor, who dreams to marry a prince charming but unfortunately marries Arshad who does not care for her and her family at all, only caring for Noor's wealth.

Cast
Meenakshi Gupta/Reena Kapoor as Noor 
Harsh Khurana as Arshad
Jiten Lalwani as Daanish
Shashikala as Dadi 
Pooja Madan as Tasleem 
Bharat Kapoor as Ahmed
Madhavi Chopra as  Ariba
Gunn Kansara

References

External links

2003 Indian television series debuts
Sahara One original programming
Indian drama television series